The San Diego Seals are a lacrosse team based in San Diego, California. The team plays in the National Lacrosse League (NLL). The 2020 season is their 2nd season in the NLL. Due to the COVID-19 pandemic, the season was suspended on March 12, 2020. On April 8, the league made a further public statement announcing the cancellation of the remaining games of the 2020 season and that they would be exploring options for playoffs once it was safe to resume play.

Regular season

Final standings

Game log

Regular season
Reference:

The eighth game of the season was a home game played at the Orleans Arena in Paradise.

Cancelled games

Roster

See also
2020 NLL season

References

San Diego
San Diego Seals seasons
San Diego Seals